SS Mira may refer to:
 , a ship that convoyed with the icebreaker Sampo during the Finnish Civil War
 , a ship owned by Holm & Molzen from 1923 to 1929
 , a cargo ship sunk in May 1943 by American aircraft
 , a cargo ship which collided with another vessel and sank in November 1916
 , a cargo ship which collided with the wreck of the ocean liner Gneisenau and sank in 1949
 , a ship that rescued some of the crew from the wreck of the cargo ship Anna in 1914

See also
 Mira (disambiguation)

Ship names